Bill Thripp (26 January 1940 – 15 February 2007) was an Australian rules footballer who played for Collingwood in the Victorian Football League (VFL).

Thripp, the father of Sydney utility Terry, was recruited from Richmond Scouts. He played as a centre half back in the Collingwood team which lost the 1960 VFL Grand Final.

He later coached the Warners Bay Bulldogs in the Newcastle Australian Football League and steered them to a maiden premiership in 1984, going through the entire season undefeated.

References

1940 births
2007 deaths
Collingwood Football Club players
Australian rules footballers from Victoria (Australia)